Twister II is a wooden roller coaster located at Elitch Gardens in Denver, Colorado.

This is a custom built wooden coaster based upon the original coaster Mr. Twister that was at Elitch Gardens before the park was moved to its new location in 1995. The roller coaster was designed by John Pierce, who also designed the famous defunct The Rattler wooden roller coaster at Six Flags Fiesta Texas. It was constructed by the Hensel Phelps Construction Co. The trains were made by the Philadelphia Toboggan Coasters company. Twister II is significantly tamer than the original Mr. Twister.

The motto for the ride is "Built wilder the second time around!"

Layout

Queue
Riders venture through the queue area as it winds through the middle of the coaster's layout. Once riders head into the station area, there are paintings of the original Elitch Gardens' roller coasters hanging on the wall below the boarding area. Riders then board the Philadelphia Toboggan Coasters trains.

Ride Experience
Leaving the station, adjacent to the railroad tracks, the track makes a right hand turn to the  lift hill. From the lift hill, riders can view other rides at the park, as well as the Downtown Denver skyline. Leaving the lift hill, trains snake around a swooping  drop, mimicking the drop on the original Mister Twister. This is followed by a  drop to the ground, and a rise up into a big turnaround, and another drop. After the second drop, the track goes through a double up type element wrapping around the first drop turn, before making another drop and hill and descending into the big helix. Upon leaving the helix, there is a slight straight segment before dropping to the left, entering a tunnel in the structure of the second turnaround. From the tunnel, a straight segment precedes another turnaround that leads into the final brakes.

Overall, the layout of Twister II has similarities to the Mister Twister, but a noticeable difference is the helix entry. While Mister Twister went down the second drop and into the helix right away, Twister II leaves the second drop and goes up a double up hill, then makes another drop and rise, and enters the helix near the station. Because of this, the entrance to the tunnel does not cross over the second climb.

Notes
Throughout the 2005/2006 off season, some sections of Twister II got new wood and the trains received a new American flag theme. The front of the train also got a Six Flags 45th anniversary emblem painted on it, to celebrate the chains' anniversary. The height restriction was also lowered from 52 to 48 inches tall, in keeping with most other wooden coasters.

References

External links
 Twister II at RCDB.com

Elitch Gardens Theme Park
Roller coasters in Colorado
Roller coasters introduced in 1995
Roller coasters operated by Herschend Family Entertainment